Justin Jamal Coleman (born March 27, 1993) is an American football cornerback and nickelback for the Seattle Seahawks of the National Football League (NFL). He played college football at Tennessee, and signed with the Minnesota Vikings as an undrafted free agent in 2015. He has also been a member of the New England Patriots, and Detroit Lions, winning Super Bowl LI with the Patriots.

Early years
Coleman attended Brunswick High School in Brunswick, Georgia, where he was a two-sport star in both football and track for the Pirates. As a sophomore in 2008, he tallied 71 tackles, four pass-break-ups, three sacks and intercepted two passes. As a junior in 2009, he totalled 83 tackles, six pass-break-ups, and six interceptions, and also returned a kickoff for touchdown. He helped lead the team to an undefeated district season as a senior in 2010. He was teammates with Ahmaud Arbery, Darius Slay, and Tracy Walker.

Also a standout in track & field, Coleman finished second in class 4-A at the state championships in the 300m hurdles (38.82s) and fifth in the 110m hurdles (14.61s) as a senior. He also competed as a sprinter at Brunswick, posting personal-best times of 11.04 seconds in the 100-meter dash, 22.67 seconds in the 200-meter dash and 52.34 seconds in the 400-meter dash.

Regarded as a four-star recruit by Rivals.com, Coleman was ranked the No. 17 overall cornerback in the nation and the No. 16 overall prospect in the state of Georgia. He was also named to the Rivals250 Team. He was rated as a three-star recruit by Scout.com, and was considered the No. 45 overall cornerback. ESPN.com ranked him the No. 30 overall safety.

College career
Coleman enrolled in the University of Tennessee, where he played for the Tennessee Volunteers football team from 2011 to 2014. He was teammates with Atlanta Falcons wide receiver Cordarrelle Patterson in the 2012 season. As a true freshman, he played in all 12 games (starting four) at cornerback, and was 1-of-16 true freshmen to play for the Vols in 2011. As a sophomore, he started 9-of-12 games played, finishing fourth on the team with 59 tackles (3.5 for loss) and 3 passes defended. He finished his 2013 campaign with 46 tackles, 8 passes defended and an interception, which he returned for a score. As a senior in 2014, he tied for fourth in the SEC with four interceptions. Following the 2014 campaign, Coleman was invited to play in the East-West Shrine Game, where he made four tackles.

Professional career
On November 18, 2014, Coleman accepted his invitation to play in the 2015 East-West Shrine Game. On January 17, 2015, Coleman appeared in the East-West Shrine Game as part of Michael Singletary’s East team. Coleman recorded four solo tackles and deflected a pass as the East routed the West was 19-3. Coleman attended the NFL Scouting Combine as the only player from Tennessee. He completed all of the combine drills and finished with the best time of all cornerbacks in the three-cone drill. Coleman also finished third, among all corners, in the 60-yard shuttle and bench press and had the fifth best time, among corners, in the short shuttle. Coleman performed at a private workout for the New England Patriots. Coleman was projected to be a fifth to seventh round pick in the 2015 NFL Draft by NFL draft experts and scouts. He was ranked as the 28th best cornerback prospect available in the draft by DraftScout.com.

Minnesota Vikings

2015
On May 3, 2015, the Minnesota Vikings signed Coleman to a three-year, $1.59 million contract as an undrafted free agent that included a signing bonus of $20,000.

Throughout training camp, Coleman competed for a roster spot as a backup cornerback against Josh Robinson,  Jabari Price, DeMarcus Van Dyke, Marcus Sherels, and Jalil Carter. On August 30, 2015, the Minnesota Vikings waived Coleman as part of their final roster cuts.

New England Patriots
On September 4, 2015, the New England Patriots claimed Coleman off of waivers, but released him the following day.

Seattle Seahawks
On September 6, 2015, the Seattle Seahawks signed Coleman to their practice squad. Coleman received contract offers to join the New England Patriots’ practice squad and Minnesota Vikings’ practice squad, but declined to accept their offers.

New England Patriots (second stint)
On September 9, 2015, the New England Patriots signed Coleman to their active roster from the Seattle Seahawks' practice squad. Upon his arrival, Coleman was designated as the fifth cornerback in the Patriots’ depth chart, behind Malcolm Butler, Tarell Brown, Logan Ryan, and Bradley Fletcher.

Coleman was inactive as a healthy scratch for the first two games (Weeks 1–2). On September 27, 2015, Coleman made his professional regular season debut and recorded three combined tackles during a 51–17 victory against the Jacksonville Jaguars in Week 3. Coleman was activated over Bradley Fletcher and an injury to Tarell Brown. Heading into Week 5, Coleman became the third cornerback on the depth chart after Tarell Brown and Bradley Fletcher were placed on injured reserve. On October 29, 2015, Coleman earned his first career start and collected a season-high five solo tackles and made one pass deflection during the Patriots’ 36–7 victory against the Miami Dolphins in Week 8. In Week 10, Coleman made four combined tackles and a pass deflection before exiting the Patriots’ 27–26 victory at the New York Giants after injuring his hand. Coleman remained inactive for the next three games (Weeks 11–13). Rashaan Melvin replaced Coleman during his absence. Coleman aggravated his hand injury and was subsequently sidelined for the Patriots’ Week 17 loss at the Miami Dolphins. He finished his rookie season in 2015 with 21 combined tackles (17 solo), five pass deflections, and one fumble recovery in ten games and two starts.

The New England Patriots finished first in the AFC East with a 12–4 record and earned a first round bye. On January 16, 2016, Coleman appeared in his first career playoff game and recorded three solo tackles and made one pass deflection during a 27–20 victory against the Kansas City Chiefs in the AFC Divisional Round. The following week, he made four solo tackles and a pass deflection as the Patriots lost 20–18 at the Denver Broncos during the AFC Championship Game.

2016
On March 7, 2016, the New England Patriots offered Coleman a tender sheet as he became an exclusive-rights free agent. On April 13, 2016, Coleman signed a one-year, $525,000 exclusive-rights tender. Coleman entered training camp as a backup cornerback. He competed with Jonathan Jones, Brock Vereen, E. J. Biggers, Cre'Von LeBlanc, V'Angelo Bentley, and Darryl Roberts to be the fourth cornerback on the depth chart. Head coach Bill Belichick named Coleman the fourth cornerback to begin the season. He was listed behind Logan Ryan, Malcolm Butler, and Cyrus Jones.

Coleman was inactive as a healthy scratch for two games (Weeks 5–6). In Week 7, Coleman collected a season-high two solo tackles and made one pass deflection during a 27–16 victory at the Pittsburgh Steelers. Coleman was inactive as a healthy scratch for three consecutive games (Weeks 11–13) and was also inactive for a Week 16 victory against the New York Jets. He was surpassed on the depth chart by Jonathan Jones and Eric Rowe. He finished the season with eight solo tackles and three pass deflections in ten games and one start.

The New England Patriots finished the 2016 NFL season with a 14–2 record and earned a first round bye. Unfortunately, Coleman was inactive as a healthy scratch as the Patriots season won three consecutive playoff games to reach Super Bowl LI. On February 5, 2017, the Patriots appeared in Super Bowl LI and defeated the Atlanta Falcons by a score of 34–28 in overtime.

2017
On March 7, 2017, the New England Patriots placed an exclusive-rights tender on Coleman. On March 17, 2017, Coleman signed his one-year, $615,000 exclusive-rights tender to remain with the Patriots. During training camp, Coleman competed Eric Rowe, Cyrus Jones, and Jonathan Jones to be the third cornerback on the Patriots’ depth chart.

Seattle Seahawks (second stint)
On September 1, 2017, the Seattle Seahawks traded their seventh round pick (205th overall) in the 2018 NFL Draft to the New England Patriots in exchange for Coleman. Head coach Pete Carroll named Coleman the fifth cornerback on the Seahawks’ depth chart to begin the regular season. He was listed behind Richard Sherman, Shaquill Griffin, Neiko Thorpe, and Jeremy Lane. Coleman was also named the first-team nickelback to start the season.

On October 1, 2017, Coleman made a tackle, a pass deflection, and returned his first career interception for a touchdown during the Seahawks’ 46–18 victory against the Indianapolis Colts in Week 4. Coleman intercepted a pass by Colts’ quarterback Jacoby Brissett, that was intended for wide receiver Kamar Aiken, and returned it 28-yards during the second quarter for his first career touchdown. In Week 8, he made one tackle and made his first career sack with defensive end Michael Bennett during a 41–38 win against the Houston Texans. Coleman’s first sack was on Texans’ quarterback Deshaun Watson for a six-yard loss in the third quarter. In Week 9, Coleman collected a season-high seven combined tackles and broke up a pass during the Seahawks’ 17–14 loss against the Washington Redskins. On December 3, 2017, Coleman made three combined tackles and made the first solo sack of his career during a 24–10 victory against the Philadelphia Eagles in Week 13. He sacked Eagles’ quarterback Carson Wentz for a six-yard loss at the end of the third quarter. On December 24, 2017, Coleman recorded three combined tackles, deflected a pass, and returned an interception by Dak Prescott for a 30-yard touchdown during the third quarter of a 21–12 win at the Dallas Cowboys in Week 16. Coleman finished the 2017 NFL season with 42 combined tackles (31 solo), nine pass deflections, two interceptions, 1.5 sacks, and two touchdowns in 16 games and five starts.

2018

On March 12, 2018, the Seattle Seahawks placed a second-round restricted free agent tender on Coleman. Coleman retained his role as the first-team nickelback and also began the season as the third cornerback on the depth chart, behind Shaquill Griffin and Neiko Thorpe. On October 28, 2018, he made four combined tackles, broke up a pass attempt, and intercepted a pass by Lions’ quarterback Matthew Stafford, that was intended for wide receiver Golden Tate, to seal the Seahawks’ 28–14 victory at the Detroit Lions in Week 8. In Week 13, Coleman collected a career-high ten combined tackles (eight solo), deflected a pass, and was credited with half a sack during a 43–16 victory against the San Francisco 49ers. On December 10, 2018, Coleman made one tackle and returned a fumble recovery for a touchdown as the Seahawks defeated the Minnesota Vikings 21–7 in Week 14. Coleman returned a fumble for a 29-yard touchdown during the fourth quarter after Jacob Martin stripped the ball during a sack on quarterback Kirk Cousins. He finished the season with 55 combined tackles (41 solo), ten pass deflections, one interception, one fumble recovery, one touchdown, and was credited with half a sack in 16 games and five starts. He received an overall grade of 67.3 from Pro Football Focus, which ranked as the 54th best grade among all qualified cornerbacks in 2018.

Detroit Lions

2019 season
On March 14, 2019, Coleman signed a four-year, $36 million contract with the Detroit Lions.
In week 6 against the Green Bay Packers, Coleman intercepted a pass from Aaron Rodgers that bounced off the hands of wide receiver Darrius Shepherd and returned it for 55 yards in the 23–22 loss.

2020 season
Coleman was placed on the reserve/COVID-19 list by the Lions on July 30, 2020, and was activated from the list five days later. He was placed on injured reserve on September 15, 2020 with a hamstring injury. He was activated on October 31.

Coleman was released by the Lions after the season on March 12, 2021.

Miami Dolphins
On March 18, 2021, Coleman signed a one-year contract with the Miami Dolphins. In Week 10 against the Baltimore Ravens, Coleman intercepted Lamar Jackson's pass to seal the 22-10 win for the Dolphins.

Seattle Seahawks (third stint)
On March 23, 2022, Coleman signed a one year contract with the Seattle Seahawks.

References

External links
 Tennessee Volunteers biography

Living people
1993 births
American football cornerbacks
Detroit Lions players
Minnesota Vikings players
New England Patriots players
Players of American football from Georgia (U.S. state)
People from Brunswick, Georgia
Miami Dolphins players
Seattle Seahawks players
Tennessee Volunteers football players